Government General Degree College, Pedong, established in 2015, is a government degree college in Pedong, Kalimpong district. Pedong is 22.3 km from Kalimpong town. It offers undergraduate courses in science and arts. It is affiliated to the University of North Bengal.

Departments

Science
Geology
It has its future prospects as the college is well within the reach of Main Central Thrust zone of the Himalaya. Itself the college is situated on the bedrocks of lesser Himalayan sequence. They are principally schistose rocks. The schistose rocks are composed of biotite, chlorite, feldspar, quartz, rare garnet. Main central thrust region had been of issue since the last 40 years in the field of geology. Latest data, paper and scientific researchers had taken the process of channel flow of higher Himalayan rocks upon these rocks and Lingtse gneiss in the study area. However, role of fault bound tectonics had also been envisaged. The department is still being equipped with laboratory facilities and equipment. Basic equipment like universal stage (microscope) and computer are available. 
Physics
Mathematics
Chemistry

Arts
Nepali
English
History
Political Science
Sociology

See also

References

External links
http://pedongcollege.in/
University of North Bengal
University Grants Commission
National Assessment and Accreditation Council

Universities and colleges in Kalimpong district
Colleges affiliated to University of North Bengal
Educational institutions established in 2015
2015 establishments in West Bengal